Dhivya College of Education was established in Chetpet, Thiruvannamalai District, Tamil Nadu, India in 2005 by B.Selvarajan Educational Trust under the leadership of B.Selvarajan.

Affiliation 
Dhivya College of Education gets its recognition from Government of Tamil Nadu and approved by National Council for Teacher Education, Bangalore and affiliated to Tamil Nadu Teachers Education University, Chennai.Initially College was affiliated to Thiruvalluvar University, Vellore.

Courses 
Dhivya College of Education offers 1 Under Graduate and 1 Post Graduate Programme. Bachelor of Education (B.Ed) in UG Master of Education (M.Ed) in PG.

History 
Dhivya College of Education was established in 2005 with 100 students in Bachelor of Education (B.Ed) affiliated to Thiruvalluvar University. In 2007 additional intake of 100 students in Bachelor of Education (B.Ed) was sanctioned. In 2008  Master of Education (M.Ed) course was initiated with 25 students. In 2011 got additional intake of 10 students in Master of Education (M.Ed).

Accreditation 
Dhivya College of Education was accredited by National Assessment and Accreditation Council (NAAC), Bangalore in 2011.

Institutions 
The management has an excellent track record for more than 20 years for serving education in very high standards through
 Dhivya Polytechnic College
 Dhivya Matriculation Higher Secondary School
 Dhivya College of Arts And Science
 Dhivya High School
 Dhivya College of Education
 Dhivya Teacher Training Institute

See also
Education in India
Literacy in India
List of institutions of higher education in Tamil Nadu

References

External links 
 http://www.naac.gov.in/
 http://tnteu.in/
 https://www.dhivya.ac.in/

Colleges of education in Tamil Nadu
Education in Tiruvannamalai district
Educational institutions established in 2005
2005 establishments in Tamil Nadu